Brycea itatiayae is a moth of the subfamily Arctiinae. It is found in Brazil.

References

Lithosiini